Periasamy Geetha Jeevan (born 6 May 1970) is an Indian Tamil politician serving as the current Minister for Social Welfare and Women Empowerment of Tamil Nadu. She is a Member of the Legislative Assembly, representing Thoothukkudi constituency in the Tamil Nadu Legislative Assembly. She also formerly served as the Minister for Animal Husbandry of Tamil Nadu.

Early life 
Geetha Jeevan was born in Thoothukudi, Tamil Nadu, India, on 6 May 1970 and is the daughter of N. Periasamy, himself a former Thoothukkudi constituency MLA. She holds a master's degree in commerce awarded by A.P.C. Mahalakshmi College for Women, Thoothukudi, having previously attended Geetha Matriculation Higher Secondary School in the city.

Political career 
Geetha Jeevan was a member and chairperson of Thoothukudi district panchayat between 1996 and 2006. In 2006, for first time she became an MLA representing Thoothukkudi constituency in Tamil Nadu Legislative Assembly. The Social Welfare ministry portfolio was given to her when Poongothai Aladi Aruna was implicated in a telephone controversy.

In the 2011 Tamil Nadu state election, she was defeated by S. T. Chellapandian of the AIADMK. In the 2016 and 2021 elections, she was consecutively elected as an MLA from her constituency and became Minister for Social Welfare and Women Empowerment in the ministry headed by Chief Minister of Tamil Nadu M. K. Stalin, the third son of the former chief minister M. Karunanidhi.

References 

1970 births
21st-century Indian women politicians
21st-century Indian politicians
Indian politicians
Indian Tamil politicians
Living people
Tamil Nadu MLAs 2006–2011
Tamil Nadu MLAs 2016–2021
Tamil Nadu MLAs 2021–2026
Dravida Munnetra Kazhagam politicians
People from Thoothukudi
Tamil Nadu ministers
Tamil Nadu politicians
Women members of the Tamil Nadu Legislative Assembly